Naseer Turabi (15 June 1945 – 10 January 2021) was a Pakistani poet. Playback singer Ahmed Rushdi played significant role in his success and also helped popularize his ghazals.

Biography
Turabi's father, Allama Rasheed Turabi, was a religious scholar.  

Turabi came to Pakistan after the independence of Pakistan in 1947. He received his M.A. in Mass Communications from University of Karachi in 1968. He lived in Karachi.

Turabi was friends with fellow poets Faiz Ahmed Faiz, Nasir Kazmi, and Mustufa Zaidi.

Naseer Turabi died in Karachi on January 10, 2021. He was interred at the Wadi-e-Hussain graveyard in Karachi.

Career 
He began writing poetry in 1962. His first collection of poetry, Aks-e-Faryadi, was published in 2000. He wrote two other books: Laaraib and Sheyriaat.

Pakistani singer Abida Parveen provided vocal rendering for his poem Woh hamsafar tha. The ghazal was written in response to the fall of Dhaka. It was later used as a theme song for the drama series Humsafar. 

He also wrote lyrics for the theme song "Dil Ka Jo Mol Chukatay Honge" of Mol and Zindagi Gulzar Hai drama series. He has also written lyrics of Dil Aitebaar for Khwab Saraye and for Yaqeen Ka Safar OST.

Accomplishments 

 Executive Member - Pakistan Writers Gui."ld, Sindh (1978–83)
 Member Syndicate - Karachi University (Governor's Nominee (1994–97)
 Member Board of Governors - Area Study Center for Europe (1994–97)
 Member Board of Governors - "REHAB" (NGO) (1998-2001)
 Re-nominated Member Syndicate - Karachi University, by the Governor Sindh (2001–04)
 Member Board of Governors, Institute of Clinical Psychology (2001–04)
 Coordinator Legal Aid Committee headed by Justice (R) Nasir Aslam Zahid (2007–09)
 Participated in Mushairas and Literary Seminars locally and internationally and all over Pakistan as a Prominent Urdu Poet from Pakistan (1979-)
 Conducting Literary Programs on National Radio and Television for the past 45 years.
 Contributed weekly columns in the  daily "Jahan Pakistan" (Oct 2013-May 2015)
 Author of Poetry collection – "AKS Faryadi" which includes his globally famous poem "Wo Hamsafar Tha", with the maximum hits on any Pakistani poetry on YouTube in the shortest duration (2000).
 Research compilation of Linguistic requirements of Urdu in "Shairiyat". This book is prescribed by Board of Secondary Education Sindh, Pakistan in the Intermediate syllabus (2013).
 Printed Second poetry collection "Laraib" (2016).
 Advised in Hamdard University, Pakistan to develop Curriculum for Bachelors and Masters Level Programs.
 Mentored research students for thesis on Urdu Poetry and Literature.
 Conducted, hosted, and presided over seminars for the promotion of Urdu Language.
 Developed a concept after research on Mir Anees (Great poet) Marsia and connecting it with the Video Camera - film making technique.
 Worked on world-famous Urdu Poet, "Ahmed Faraz's Intikhab" of his poetry collection.
 2020: Allama Iqbal Award from the Academy of Letters

External links
 Selected Poetry of Naseer Turabi
 Wo Hamsafar The Ghazal - Naseer Turabi

References 

Urdu-language poets from India
Pakistani poets
Urdu-language poets from Pakistan
Muhajir people
1945 births
2021 deaths
Pakistani people of Hyderabadi descent
University of Karachi alumni